Charles Towne may refer to:
Charles Towne (artist) (1763–1840), English landscape and animal painter
Charles A. Towne (1858–1928), American politician
Charles Hanson Towne (1877–1949), American author, poet and editor, who wrote "The Harvest of the Sea" about the RMS Titanic

See also 
 Charles Hard Townes (born 1915), American physicist and educator
 Charles Towne Landing
 Charles Town (disambiguation)
 Charlestown (disambiguation)

Towne, Charles